Snap general elections were held in Dominica on 6 December 2022.

Background 
On 6 November 2022 (three days after independence day), Prime Minister Roosevelt Skerrit called a snap election "to ensure the continued renewal" of his government. Nomination day would be 18 November, and the election itself on 6 December. The ruling Dominica Labour Party (DLP) announced its candidates on 8 November.

Opposition parties, including former ruling parties United Workers' Party (UWP) and Dominica Freedom Party (DFP), and civil society organisations published an open letter on 9 November condemning Skerrit's call for elections. External observers, including the OAS, the Commonwealth Secretariat, Caricom, and the Caribbean Court of Justice, had made recommendations for electoral reform in Dominica in order to assuage concerns of voter fraud, among other reasons. By 2022, Skerrit had implemented none. In light of this situation, the UWP and the DFP decided to boycott the elections and call on President Charles Savarin to reconvene the Assembly.  In a separate letter, the nonpartisan Nature Island Dominica Civil Liberties Foundation (NIDCLF) pointed out irregularities in past elections which occurred due to the lack of reforms.

A three-month-old party which did not sign the open letter, Team Unity Dominica (TUD), announced its readiness to take on the DLP, and asked for support from other opposition parties. TUD general secretary Alex Bruno also claimed to be in contact with potential defectors from the DLP. Individual independent candidates have also announced plans to contest the election.

Political scientist Peter Wickham pointed out that the call for elections occurred soon after the UWP's leader resigned, so that Skerrit would avoid competition from a new opposition leader.

Electoral system
The 21 elected members of the House of Assembly are elected in single-member constituencies under first-past-the-post voting. A further nine members are either elected by the Assembly after it convenes or appointed by the President (five on the advice of the Prime Minister and four on the advice of the Leader of the Opposition) to be Senators; from there the President is chosen by the Assembly and the President appoints a Prime Minister.

Candidates 
45 candidates were nominated, 19 of whom were independent candidates. 10 of the incumbent DLP members were not nominated for a new term.

In six constituencies, the DLP nominee was the only candidate, winning by default. PM Skerrit and Health Minister Irving McIntyre were re-elected in this manner. The remaining four were new nominees.

Conduct
The Commonwealth Secretariat, Organization of American States (OAS), Caribbean Community (CARICOM) and the Latin American Council of Electoral Experts (LACEE) sent election observers with the Commonwealth of Nations concluding that "election day and the pre-election atmosphere were largely peaceful and voters were free to exercise their franchise, the results of which are a collective will of those who voted. They also commended Electoral Office and its staff on their performance during the electoral process," noting that "while wholly consistent with the Constitution, the announcement of the snap elections on 6 November created certain challenges for some stakeholders."

Results

References

Elections in Dominica
Dominica
General
Dominica